Rear Admiral Muhammad Moazzam Ilyas  (b. 10 May 1965) was a two-star rank admiral in the Pakistan Navy who has retired from service and his last appointment was Director General Joint Warfare and Training (DG JW&T) at Joint Staff Headquarters (JSHQ).

Biography
Moazzam Ilyas joined the Pakistan and got commission in operations branch (communication) in 1984. He is a graduate of Joint Command and Staff College Shrivenham, UK. He has master's degrees in Defence Studies from King's College London, and Strategic Studies from Quaid-e-Azam University, Islamabad.

Commands and Military Life
His command appointments include commands of two Destroyers PNS Badr & PNS Babur as well as three missile boats named PNS Jalalat, Himmat and Haibat. He has also served as Naval and Air Attache at Tehran, Iran from 2006 to 2009. From there, he was promoted to Commodore in 2009.

Ashore he has served as Assistant Chief of Naval Staff Operations (ACNS-Ops), Chief Staff Officer to Commander Pakistan Fleet (CSO to COMPAK), as well as Assistant Chief of Naval Staff Plans (ACNS-P). Afterwards, he was appointed to Commander North (COMNOR), from where he was promoted to rear admiral.

Rear Admiral Moazzam took over command of Combined Task Force 150 from August 2015 to January 2016.

He went to become Chief Instructor, Allied Officers Division at the NDU (CI-AOD). He was made Deputy Chief of Naval Staff Training and Evaluation (DCNS T&E) in 2016 and then served as Commandant of the PNWC and Commander Central Punjab (COMCEP) in Lahore.

He was appointed Commander Coastal Areas (COMCOAST) from 1 November 2017.

He was shifted to Joint Staff Headquarters (JSHQ) on 20 January 2019 as Director General Joint Warfare & Training (DG JW&T). He is also a member of Joint Chiefs of Staff Committee. He is also President, Services Sports Control Board at Joint Staff Headquarters.

Awards and decorations

References

1965 births
Living people
Alumni of King's College London
Pakistan Navy admirals
Pakistan Marines
Pakistani military attachés